Piazza Vittorio may refer to:
 Piazza Vittorio Emanuele II (Rome)
 Piazza Vittorio Veneto, Turin